Haroldo Pereira da Silva (10 September 1929 – 24 May 1995) was a Brazilian track and field athlete who competed at the 1948 Summer Olympics in the 100 metres, 200 metres and 4 x 100 metres relay.

Competition record

References

External links
 

1929 births
1995 deaths
Brazilian male sprinters
Olympic athletes of Brazil
Athletes (track and field) at the 1948 Summer Olympics
20th-century Brazilian people